Stuyvenberg Castle is a residence of the Belgian Royal Family, located in Laeken, Brussels. Château du Stuyvenberg is situated at an elevation of 56 meters.

History and use
Stuyvenberg Castle was built in 1725, acquired for 200,000 francs by the Belgian State in 1840, and later bought by Leopold II who donated it to the Royal Trust. It is near the Royal Castle of Laeken, the official residence of the King and Queen of the Belgians.

The first Belgian King, Leopold I, used the castle for his mistress , and their second child Arthur was born there in 1852. Later, it was the birthplace of King Baudouin in 1930 and Albert II in 1934; both spent their early years at Stuyvenberg. After World War II, Elisabeth of Bavaria, widow of King Albert I, lived at the castle until her death in 1965. Subsequently, it was used for almost three decades as a guest house for foreign dignitaries. From 1998 to 2014, Queen Fabiola, widow of King Baudouin, called it her home. She died at Stuyvenberg on December 5, 2014.

The residence has also been home to Princess Astrid of Belgium, the sister of the current King Philippe.

References

External link

Royal residences in Belgium
Stuyvenberg
Stuyvenberg